Zortrax is a Polish manufacturer of 3D printers and filaments for SMB market and rapid prototyping for industries, including robotics and automation, architecture, industrial design, engineering, aviation, industrial automation. Zortrax machines work with dedicated software, firmware and filaments.

History 
Zortrax was founded by Rafal Tomasiak and Marcin Olchanowski. An idea for company came from online store supporting DIY licensed 3D printers. They run the shop and worked on the new machine simultaneously. The idea was to create a complete 3D printing environment, which would allow to distance themselves from the DIY industry.

Work on M200 started in 2011 and completed in 2013. To support production, they launched Kickstarter campaign and gathered almost $180 000. Zortrax shipped 3D printers to all backers and invested money in further development. Bonds issued in January and March 2014 brought 7.2M PLN. On December 3, 2015 Zortrax opened its showroom in Warsaw, Poland – the Zortrax Store. The main idea for the showroom is to broaden the knowledge of 3D printing among both professional and students. It’s one of the first mono-brand stationary stores in Europe.

In 2016, the company launched Zortrax M300. Later, Zortrax M300 Plus was launched, with a build volume of 300x300x300 mm, it has a heavy-duty steel frame surrounding the printing area, which is entirely enclosed with plastic sides, steel back and a hinged slightly translucent black door.

In 2018, Zortrax launched Inkspire, a desktop resin 3D printer. It is an upgrade to traditional stereolithography printers.

In 2020, Zortrax collaborated with the European Space Agency to develop a technology that enables the production of 3D printing composite parts using two blends of PEEK filament.

Technology 
Zortrax manufactures Layer Plastic Deposition (LPD) technology. The technology is using three-dimensional data to create three-dimensional model in layer after layer process.

Layer Plastic Deposition is a technology in which printer is melting thermoplastic material (filament) in the extruder and apply it precisely on heated platform layer after layer. Zortrax M200 dedicated printing materials are: Z-ABS, Z-ULTRAT, Z-GLASS, Z-HIPS, Z-PCABS, Z-PETG, Z-ESD, Z-ASA Pro, Z-PLA Pro, Z-SEMIFLEX (for Zortrax M200 Plus), Zortrax M300: Z-HIPS, Z-PETG, Z-GLASS, Z-ESD, Z-ASA Pro, Z-PLA Pro and for Zortrax Inventure: Z-SEMIFLEX, Z-ULTRAT Plus, Z-PLA, Z-PETG, Z-SUPPORT, Z-SUPPORT Plus.

Zortrax Z-SUITE software is created specifically for Zortrax machines. Z-SUITE allows to open a .stl, .obj or .dxf file and set printing preferences. It is the only 3D printing software in which users are able to convert 2D files into 3D models and cut models directly in Z-SUITE software. It is dedicated for both Windows and Mac users. Zortrax developed an application for storing and downloading 3D models - the Zortrax Library. It is available in both Z-SUITE and online.

Prizes and awards 
 2014 50 Creative in Business for Brief Magazine
 2014 The Jan Wejchert Prize of the Polish Business Roundtable in Vision and Innovation Category
 2014 Design Alive Award for Best Strategists
 2014 25 Polish Best Industrial Designs
 2014 Best 3D Printer in the Plug’n’Play Category, 3D Hubs
 2015 Top Design Award in Science-Medicine-Industry Category
 2015 3rd Most Wanted 3D Printer in 3D Hubs Community
 2015  Zortrax M200 - the Best Plug&Play 3D Printer in 2015&2016, the World's Best Desktop 3D Printer by 3D Hubs Community
 2015 Zortrax M200 - 2nd Best Overall FDM 3D Printer, 3D Printing Shootout by Make Magazine
 2017 Teraz Polska Polish Promotional Logo awarded by the Polish Promotional Logo Foundation

See also
 List of 3D printer manufacturers

References

External links
 Zortrax Official Site

3D printer companies
Manufacturing companies of Poland
Companies established in 2013
Polish brands
Computing output devices
3D printers
Fused filament fabrication